David B. Williams is a noted Canadian Ojibway aboriginal artist.

Originally from Garden River First Nation just outside Sault Ste. Marie, Ontario, David resided much of his adult life in Saskatoon, Saskatchewan and Winnipeg, Manitoba. David B. Williams was born December 26, 1947, and died September 29, 2009, at the age of 62 in Winnipeg and is buried at the Garden River First Nation.

He was a painter and printmaker.

Solo exhibitions
1979 – Gallery One – Saskatoon. Saskatchewan
1980 – Gallery One – Saskatoon. Saskatchewan
1982 – First Man Art Gallery – Calgary. Alberta
1986 – The Trading Post – Saskatoon. Saskatchewan
1987 – The Trading Post – Saskatoon. Saskatchewan

Grants and awards
1979 – Canada Council Grant (Explorations)
1983 – Manitoba Arts Council Grant
1987 – Indian Arts and Crafts Manitoba Inc.

Special presentations
1980 – Purchase on behalf of Native Law Society of University of Saskatchewan for presentation to Mr. Justice Berger. Supreme Court Justice of B.C.
1980 – Purchase of City of Saskatoon for special presentation to the Saskatoon Curling Team winning the Silver Broom Bonspiel.
1984 – Syncrude Oil Corporation.
1986 – Purchased (a print) by Saskatchewan Mining and Development Corporation for the John Howard Society Native Art Auction Saskatoon. Saskatchewan.
1987 – Métis National Council presented to Pope John Paul at Fort Simpson, NWT
1987 – Peace Hill Trust. Edmonton. Alberta

Principal collections
Mendell Art Gallery – Saskatoon. Saskatchewan.
Saskatchewan Arts Board – Regina. Saskatchewan.
Shell Oil Corporation – Calgary. Alberta
Gulf Oil Corporation – Calgary. Alberta
Canada Council Art Bank – Ottawa. Ontario (1982)
Department of Indian Affairs – Ottawa. Ontario (1983)
Province of Manitoba – (print – 1983)
Suncor Oil Corporation – fort McMurray. Alberta (1983)
Interprovincial Pipeline Corporation – Edmonton. Alberta (1984)
National Museum – Ottawa. Ontario
Manitoba Government – Winnipeg. Manitoba
Peace Hill Trust – Winnipeg. Manitoba
Denver Museum of Fine Arts – Denver. Colorado (U.S.A.)
Denver Museum of Fine Arts – Denver. Colorado (U.S.A.)
Peace Hill Trust – Edmonton. Alberta
Aboriginal Centre of Winnipeg – Winnipeg. Manitoba
Indian Family Centre – Winnipeg. Manitoba

Professional affiliations
C.A.R.F.A.C. (Manitoba) (1995)
Indian Crafts and Arts Manitoba Inc. (1988)
National Symposium of Indian Art – Hazeleton. B.C. (August 1983) unable to attend. Forwarded five artist proof prints to be sold for the express purpose of a proposed National Indian Arts Scholarship now under study by a steering committee.

Reviews and interviews - publications
"Accent on the Arts" – Star-Phoenix – Saskatoon. Saskatchewan (Saturday. October 13. 1979)
"Woodsmoke and Sweetgrass" CKY Television – Winnipeg. Manitoba (Interviewed December 1982 – Aired January 1983)
"The Beaver" – A Hudson Bay Co. Publication (Winter Edition issued for January 1983)
B.B.C September 1985

Art auction/benefit
Second National Native Art Auction. Native Canadian Centre of Toronto (April 1982) – Toronto. Ontario (Refer to catalogue of painting – 1982)
Manitoba Museum of Man and Nature – Winnipeg. Man. (January 1983) (Group show auction/benefit)
First Annual Native Art Auction – Saskatoon. Saskatchewan (John Howard Society)
Art 86 – Brantford. Ontario (Mohawk Institute)
Second Annual Native Art Auction – Saskatoon. Saskatchewan (John Howard Society)

Public exhibitions (donations)
Native Pavilion. Indian Friendship Centre. Saskatoon Folkfest. Saskatoon. Saskatchewan (1981)
Native Pavilion Indian and Métis Friendship Centre. Winnipeg Folklorama – Winnipeg, Manitoba (1983)
Native Pavilion. Indian Friendship Centre. Saskatoon Folkfest – Saskatoon. Saskatchewan (1986)

School exhibitions (public, private, native)
David Livingstone Community School – Winnipeg. Manitoba (1983)
St. Michael’s Community School – Saskatoon. Saskatchewan (1982)
Prince Philip Elementary School – Saskatoon. Saskatchewan (1982)
Lester B. Pearson Public School – Saskatoon. Saskatchewan (1981)
Native Survival School – Saskatoon. Saskatchewan (1981)
Father Vachon Catholic School. Saskatoon. Saskatchewan (1981)

Group exhibitions
1980 – Saskatchewan Open Mendel Art Gallery. A juried Biennial exhibition of Saskatchewan art work was purchased by the Saskatchewan Art Board.
1983 – (January) Manitoba Museum of Man and Nature. A benefit auction.
1983 – Canada Canoe Festival – Victoria Island – Ottawa/Hull
1983 – Second Annual Atlantic Festival of Indian Arts and Crafts October 21–23 – Dalhousie Arts Centre. Halifax. Nova Scotia
1983 – Christmas Craft Show and Sale of Canadian Indian Arts and Crafts – November 4–6–Marlborough Inn. Calgary. Alberta
1983 – Eight Annual CKRC-CKWG Arts Manitoba. Juried Art Exhibition November 14–25 – Manitoba Archives Building 200 Vaughn Street. Winnipeg. Manitoba
1983 – C.A.R.F.A.C. (Manitoba) – Annual group/benefit – Winnipeg Art Gallery, Winnipeg, Manitoba – November
1984 – B.C. Indian Arts and Crafts (Trade) Show. Hyatt Regency Vancouver. B.C.
1984 – Third Annual Atlantic Festival of Indian Arts and Crafts. World Trade Centre. Halifax. Nova Scotia
1984 – Christmas Craft Show and Sale of Canadian Indian Arts and Crafts – Marlborough Inn. Calgary. Alberta
1984 – Fourth Annual Christmas Show and Sale of Canadian Indian Arts and Crafts. Edmonton Convention Centre. Edmonton. Alberta
1984 – Manitoba Winter Showcase of Canadian Indian Arts and Crafts. The Delta Winnipeg. Winnipeg. Manitoba
1985 – Winter Showcase of Canadian Indian Arts and Crafts. Ottawa. Ontario
1985 – Festival du Voyageur. St. Boniface. Manitoba
1985 – Canada Canoe Festival. Ottawa. Ontario
1985 – Eagle Mountain Indian Festival. Hunter Mountain – New York (U.S.A.)
1985 – Fourth Annual Atlantic Festival of Indian Arts and Crafts  Hotel Nova Scotia
1985 – C.A.N.A.D.A. – The Show and Sale of Indian Arts and Crafts. Thompson. Manitoba
1985 – Fifth Annual Christmas Show and Sale of Canadian Indian Arts and Crafts. Edmonton Convention Centre. Edmonton. Alberta
1985 – Christmas Craft Show and Sale of Canadian Indian Arts and Crafts – Calgary Convention Centre. Winnipeg. Manitoba
1985 – Manitoba Christmas Craft Sale. Winnipeg Convention Centre. Winnipeg. Manitoba
1986 – Festival du Voyageur. St. Boniface. Manitoba
1986 – International Spring Fair. Birmingham. England
1986 – Manitoba Spring Crafts Sale. Winnipeg Convention Centre. Winnipeg. Manitoba
1986 – Indian Arts and Crafts Associations (IACA) Sixth Annual Spring Wholesale Market and Retailers. Denver Merchandise Mart. Denver. Colorado (U.S.A.)
1986 - Red Cloud Indian Art Show. Heritage Centre. Pine Ridge. South Dakota (U.S.A.)
1986 – Grand National American Indian Arts and Crafts Show and Sale, Las Vegas, Nevada (U.S.A.)
1986 – Summit on Indian Business – Convention Centre. Toronto. Ontario
1986 – Seattle Art Festival ’86. Seattle. Washington (U.S.A.)
1986 – The Canadian Annual Wildlife Art and Conservation Show and Sale. Durham. Ontario
1986 – 65th Annual Indian Ceremonial. Gallup. New Mexico (U.S.A.)
1986 – Sixth Annual Christmas Show and Sale of Canadian Indian Arts and Crafts. Edmonton Convention Centre. Edmonton. Alberta
1986 – Christmas Craft Show and Sale of Canadian Indian Arts and Crafts – Marlborough Inn. Calgary. Alberta
1986 – Manitoba Christmas Craft Sale. Winnipeg Convention Centre. Winnipeg. Manitoba
1987 – Mingmak (Muskox). Saskatoon. Saskatchewan
1987 – Santa Monica Indian Ceremonial. Los Angeles. California (U.S.A.)
1987 – Winnipeg Street Festival (Winnipeg Art Gallery). Winnipeg. Manitoba
1987 – Seventh Annual Christmas Show and Sale of Canadian Indian Arts and Crafts. Edmonton Convention Centre. Edmonton. Alberta
1987 – Peace Hill Trust Jury Native Art Show. Edmonton. Alberta
1988 – Winterlude. Ottawa. Ontario
1988 – Fedstival du Voyageur ’88. St. Boniface. Manitoba
1988 – Spring Craft Show. Ottawa. Ontario
1992 – Peace Hill Trust Jury Native Art Show. Edmonton. Alberta
1994 – Peace Hill Trust Jury Native Art Show. Edmonton. Alberta
1995 – Annual Native Art Auction. John Howard Society. Saskatoon. Saskatchewan
Canada Council Art Bank
Williams, David Burning Prairies 1981 Work on paper 82/3-0446
Williams, David Buffalo - Summer Lodges/friends 1982 Work on paper 82/3-0448
Williams, David Brown Pelican/Beaver-others- 1982 Work on paper 82/3-0447

1947 births
2009 deaths
Ojibwe people
First Nations painters
20th-century indigenous painters of the Americas
First Nations printmakers
20th-century printmakers